HD 53367 is a triple star system in the constellation of Monoceros. The primary star was identified as a variable Herbig Ae/Be star in 1989. Its companion, spectroscopically discovered in 2006, is a pre-main-sequence star star with an average separation of 1.7 AU. The star system is embedded in the extended nebula IC 2177.

The binary HD 53367A is part of the hierarchical triple star system RST 3489, with an additional Herbig Ae/Be star HD 53367B of spectral class B1Ve at a projected separation of 0.6″. All stars in the system belong to the star-forming CMa OB1 association. The Hipparcos, Gaia Data Release 2, and Gaia Data Release 3 parallax values for HD 53367A are highly discrepant, but the system is thought to be about 1,000 parsecs away.

Extended nebula

HD 53367A is a very young and gas-rich system, with most of the gas still obscuring the secondary component HD 53367Ab.

References

Monoceros (constellation)
Triple star systems
Herbig Ae/Be stars
Monocerotis, V750
53367
034116
BD-10 1848
J07042551-1027156